This is a list of consorts of Serbian monarchs during the history of Serbia.

Middle Ages

Princess- and Grand Princess consorts (–1217)

Queen consorts

Nemanjić dynasty (1217–1365)

Empress consorts

Nemanjić dynasty (1346–71)

Magnate era

Mrnjavčević family (1365–95)

Lazarević family (1371–1402)

Despotess consorts

Lazarević dynasty (1402–27)

Branković dynasty (1427–59)

Kotromanić dynasty (1459)

Despotess consorts (in exile)

Branković dynasty (1459–1504)

Berislavić dynasty (1504–36)

Bakić family (1537)

Modern

Consort of the Grand Leader

Karađorđević dynasty (1804–13)

Princess consorts

Obrenović dynasty (1815–42)

Karađorđević dynasty (1842–58)

Obrenović dynasty (1858–82)

Queen consorts

Obrenović dynasty (1882–1903)

Queen consort of Serbs, Croats and Slovenes

Karađorđević dynasty (1918–29)

Queen consorts of Yugoslavia

Karađorđević dynasty (1929–45)

See also
List of princesses of Serbia

References

Sources

 
 
 
 
 

 
 
Serbia
Serbia
Consorts
Serbia